Julio Reyes Copello (born April 26, 1969) is a Colombian producer, songwriter and record engineer. Throughout his career he has worked with various artists such as Jennifer López, Marc Anthony, Thalía, Chayanne, Kany García, Alejandro Sanz, Paula Arenas, Laura Pausini and Pablo Alborán, among others, as well as receiving four Grammy Awards and seven Latin Grammy Awards.

Early life
Reyes Copello was born in 1969 in Cúcuta, Colombia and grew up in Bogotá, his interest for music started from an early age learning howto play the piano with his mother. He has two brothers, Gabriel, the president of the Colombian television network RCN, and Gerardo, an investigative journalist and one of the recipients of the Pulitzer Prize for Investigative Reporting in 1999.

Career
After graduating from the Colegio San Bartolomé La Merced, he entered to the Pontifical Xavierian University to study music. In 1996, he composed the music for the miniseries Leche, for which he won the India Catalina Award for Best Music the next year. He later received a scholarship for a master's degree in Media Writing and Production at the University of Miami in Miami, the city where he lives since 1997, following his years of study, he was chosen by Jorge Calandrelli to compose the arrangements for seven of the songs from the 2001 album Our Favorite Things by Plácido Domingo, the album featured Tony Bennet, Charlotte Church and Vanessa Williams alongside the Vienna Symphony Orchestra.

While in Miami, he met Andrés Recio, who would become his manager. After working as a songwriter for artists like Malú, Thalía and Jerry Rivera, he met Marc Anthony in 2004 with Colombian producer Estéfano, Copello would co-write songs like "Ahora Quien" and "Tu Amor Me Hace Bien" from Anthony's albums Amar Sin Mentiras and Valió la Pena. The former won the Grammy Award for Best Latin Pop Album, with Copello also receiving the award as one of the engineers of the album. His first Latin Grammy Award nomination came in 2003 for his work in Alexandre Pires's Estrella Guía, the record was nominated for Album of the Year and Best Male Pop Vocal Album at the 4th Annual Latin Grammy Awards.

During the 2000s, he continued working with Latinamerican artists such as Thalía, Ricky Martin and Jennifer Lopez. In 2009, he was one of the composers of the music for TNT's medical drama series Hawthorne. In 2011, Copello met Alejandro Sanz after a call with Universal Music's president Jesús López, the meeting would result in La Música No Se Toca, the tenth album by Sanz. At the 14th Annual Latin Grammy Awards, Copello received his firsts Latin Grammys, winning three, Record of the Year for Sanz's "Mi Marciana" and Best Contemporary Pop Vocal Album for La Música No Se Toca, both as producer and Best Engineered Album for Kany García's self-titled album as engineer.

In 2013, Copello founded the recording studio and label ArtHouse Records in Miami, producing albums by several artists such as Paula Arenas, Julio Pablo Vega, Mariana Vega and Brika, among others. Ever since his first nomination in 2003, Copello has won seven Latin Grammy Awards out of over thirty nominations, eleven Album of the Year nominations, twelve Record of the Year nominations and four Producer of the Year nominations. Many albums produced by Copello have been highly successful, with Jennifer López's Como Ama una Mujer, Chayanne's No Hay Imposibles, Alejandro Sanz's La Música No Se Toca and Ricky Martin's A Quien Quiera Escuchar peaking at number one on the Billboard Top Latin Albums chart.

Discography

(A) Album, (S), Single

Film Scoring
 Reach for Me (Film, 2008)
 Hawthorne (TV Series, 2009)
 Mars 2030 (Videogame, 2017)

Awards and nominations

Grammy Awards

Latin Grammy Awards

References

External links
 Official Website
 Art House Website

1969 births
Living people
Colombian songwriters
Colombian record producers
Latin Grammy Award winners
Latin music songwriters
Latin music record producers